is a Japanese actress.

Biography
Tanimura was born in Sakai, Osaka.  She starred in Akihiko Shiota's Canary and Norio Tsuruta's Orochi. She has also appeared in films such as Takashi Miike's God's Puzzle, Junji Sakamoto's Strangers in the City, and Kazuyoshi Kumakiri's Sketches of Kaitan City.

Filmography

Film
 Canary (2005)
 Tokyo Zombie (2005)
 The Girl Who Leapt Through Time (2006) as Kaho Fujitani (voice)
 The Chasing World (2008)
 God's Puzzle (2008)
 Orochi (2008) as Orochi
 Summer Wars (2009) as Kazuma Ikezawa (voice)
 Kanikōsen (2009)
 Oblivion Island: Haruka and the Magic Mirror (2009) as Miho (voice)
 Mei-chan no Shitsuji (2009)
 13 Assassins (2010)
 Box! (2010)
 Strangers in the City (2010)
 Sketches of Kaitan City (2010)
 Hankyū Densha (2011) as Miho
 Salvage Mice (2011)
 Soup (2012)
 Ace Attorney (2012)
 Wolf Children Ame and Yuki (2012) as Doi's wife (voice)
 The Samurai That Night (2013)
 Girl in the Sunny Place (2013)
 The Liar and His Lover (2013)
 Sweet Poolside (2014)
 The Edge of Sin (2015)
 Recall (2018)
 Stare (2020) as Fuyumi Mamiya
 Nobutora (2021)

Television
 Bio Planet WoO (2006) as Ai Kumashiro
 14-sai no Haha (2006) as Mayu Yanagisawa 
 Torihada (2007-2009) as Woman
 Pandora (2008) as Emi Mizuno 
 Taiyo to Umi no Kyoshitsu (2008) as Hana Sawamizu 
 Mei-chan's Butler (2009) as Tami Yamada 
 Hissatsu Shigotonin 2009 (2009) as Kisaragi 
 Samurai High School (2009) as Samurai Kōtarō's Wife 
 Team Medical Dragon (2010) as Fuyumi Magara
 Mori no Asagao (2010) as Koharu Yoshioka
 Honjitsu wa Taian Nari (2012) as twins Kagayama Himika and Kagayama Marika
 Taburakashi: Daikō Joyūgyō Maki (2012) as Maki Tōdō
 Platinum Town (2012) as Haruna Yamada 
 Last Hope (TV series) (2013) as Kyōko Nishimura 
 Yae no Sakura (2013) as Tokie Oda
 Kōnodori (2015)
 Beppin san (2016) as Akemi Ono
 Enjoy Drinking Alone (2021) as Wakana Gotō

References

External links
 Official website 
 

Actresses from Osaka
Japanese film actresses
Japanese television actresses
Living people
People from Sakai, Osaka
21st-century Japanese actresses
People from Osaka Prefecture
1990 births